"Quicksand" is a song recorded by the Motown girl group Martha and the Vandellas. It was written by the songwriting team of Holland-Dozier-Holland and released as a single in November 1963.

Background
"Quicksand" was built around a similar gospel-inspired delivery of the Martha and the Vandellas' breakout hit " Heat Wave", but with a slightly slower tempo and a harder edge. Like "Heat Wave", it features an analogy to a natural phenomenon, with the narrator comparing falling in love to sinking in quicksand.  Cash Box said that "it continues the hard-hitting excitement of ['Heat Wave']."

"Quicksand" was Martha and the Vandellas' third single to be written by Holland–Dozier–Holland, who would later write songs for other Motown artists such as The Supremes and the Four Tops.

Personnel
Lead vocals by Martha Reeves
Background vocals by Rosalind Ashford and Annette Beard
Produced by Brian Holland and Lamont Dozier
Written by Brian Holland, Lamont Dozier and Edward Holland Jr.
Instrumentation by the Funk Brothers:
Benny Benjamin: drums
James Jamerson: upright bass
Robert White: guitar
Eddie Willis: guitar
Jack Ashford: tambourine, vibes
Andrew "Mike" Terry: baritone saxophone solo

Chart performance
Released in November 1963 on the Gordy label, the song became another Top Ten hit for Martha & the Vandellas, eventually reaching number eight on the Billboard Hot 100.

References

1963 singles
Martha and the Vandellas songs
Songs written by Holland–Dozier–Holland
Gordy Records singles
Song recordings produced by Lamont Dozier
Song recordings produced by Brian Holland
1963 songs